Euchromius aris is a species of moth in the family Crambidae. It is found in Kenya.

The length of the forewings is 12–14 mm. The groundcolour of the forewings is creamy white, densely suffused with ochreous to dark brown scales. The hindwings are grey to light brown with a darkly bordered termen. Adults have been recorded in March.

References

Moths described in 1988
Crambinae
Moths of Africa